General elections were held in the Republic of Serbia on 20 December 1992. The vote was held only two years after the previous election, and as a result of a referendum which approved holding early elections.

The elections were won by Slobodan Milošević and his Socialist Party of Serbia (SPS), which won 101 of the 250 seats in the National Assembly. The SPS formed a government with Vojislav Šešelj's Serbian Radical Party. The presidential election was marked by a total domination of state-run media by Slobodan Milošević with accusations of voter fraud and tampering. Milan Panić refused to accept the result, and stated that he believed he was the true winner of the election.

Background
Slobodan Milošević was a candidate of the Socialist Party of Serbia and was solely endorsed by the Serbian Radical Party. 	

Milan Panić was an independent candidate endorsed by the Democratic Movement of Serbia and the Democratic Party (Serbia). The elections were boycotted by political parties  of ethnic Kosovo Albanians, who made up around 17% of the population.

Electoral lists 
Following electoral lists are electoral lists that received seats in the National Assembly after the 1992 election:

Results

President

National Assembly

References

Elections in Serbia
Elections in Serbia and Montenegro
Serbia
1992 in Yugoslavia
1992 in Serbia
Presidential elections in Serbia
December 1992 events in Europe
Pres